The 2010–11 season will be MC Saïda's 10th season in the Algerian top flight, newly renamed to the Algerian Ligue Professionnelle 1 due to the professionalization of it. MC Saïda will seek to win their first league title. They will be competing in Ligue 1, and the Algerian Cup.

Squad 2010-11
As of October 26, 2010:

Pre-season

Mid-season

Overview

{| class="wikitable" style="text-align: center"
|-
!rowspan=2|Competition
!colspan=8|Record
!rowspan=2|Started round
!rowspan=2|Final position / round
!rowspan=2|First match	
!rowspan=2|Last match
|-
!
!
!
!
!
!
!
!
|-
| Ligue 1

|  
| 6th
| 25 September 2010
| 8 July 2011
|-
| Algerian Cup

| Round of 64 
| Quarter-final
| 29 December 2010
| 8 April 2011
|-
! Total

Ligue 1

League table

Results summary

Results by round

League

Algerian Cup

Squad information

Playing statistics

|-
! colspan=10 style=background:#dcdcdc; text-align:center| Goalkeepers

|-
! colspan=10 style=background:#dcdcdc; text-align:center| Defenders

|-
! colspan=10 style=background:#dcdcdc; text-align:center| Midfielders

|-
! colspan=10 style=background:#dcdcdc; text-align:center| Forwards

|-
! colspan=10 style=background:#dcdcdc; text-align:center| Players transferred out during the season

Goalscorers

Transfers

In

Out

References

MC Saida